

Qualification

Group A

Standings

 United States qualified to the 2003 FIFA U-17 World Championship in Finland.

Group B

Standings

 Costa Rica qualified to the 2003 FIFA U-17 World Championship in Finland.

Playoffs

 Mexico qualified to the 2003 FIFA U-17 World Championship in Finland.

See also
 CONCACAF U17 Tournament
 FIFA U-17 World Cup

2003
U-17
2003
2003
2002–03 in Costa Rican football
2002–03 in Mexican football
2002–03 in Guatemalan football
2003 in Cuban sport
2002–03 in Salvadoran football
2003 in Canadian soccer
2003 in American soccer
2002–03 in Jamaican football
2003 in youth association football